Code Name Verity is a young adult historical fiction novel by Elizabeth Wein that was published in 2012. It focuses on the friendship between two young British women, one English and one Scottish, in World War II – a spy captured by the Nazis in German-occupied France and the pilot who brought her there. It was named a Michael L. Printz Honor Book in 2013, and shortlisted for the Carnegie Medal.

A loose sequel, Rose Under Fire, was published in 2013. A prequel novel, The Pearl Thief, was published in May 2017; it is a mystery involving Code Name Veritys protagonist Julie one year before the war starts.

Plot
In 1943 Nazi-occupied France, a British Lysander spy plane crashes in the fictional town of Ormaie. On board are two best friends, a pilot (Maddie, code name: Kittyhawk) and a spy (Julie, code name: Verity). The latter is soon captured by Nazi authorities, detained in a former hotel, and forced to write a confession detailing the British war effort, which she decides to write in the form of a novel. 

Through her confession, she tells the story of her friendship with Maddie, the pilot, and how she came to enter France in the first place. In the second part of the plot, the story is told from Maddie's point of view, and reveals the events that transpired after the plane crash that left both women in France, and her plan to find Verity and bring her back home. 

In the end, Maddie kills Julie to prevent her from being tortured or sent to Natzweiler-Struthof as a specimen for medical experiments. After that, Maddie receives Julie's confession from Engel, a chemist at the hotel who has had a crisis of conscience, and she and the French Resistance use Engel’s information to blow up the hotel, which the Nazis also use as their center of operations. After that, Maddie escapes to England.

Critical reception 
Code Name Verity received critical acclaim. The New York Times praised it as "a fiendishly plotted mind game of a novel, the kind you have to read twice", and Kirkus Reviews called it a "carefully researched, precisely written tour de force". Code Name Verity is one of five young adult novels published in 2012 to receive starred reviews in all six trade journals.

The novel won the 2013 Michael L. Printz Honor Book, the Edgar Allan Poe Award for Best Young Adult Novel, and the Golden Kite Honor in 2013. It was also shortlisted for the Carnegie Medal.

References 

2012 American novels
American young adult novels
American historical novels
American thriller novels
Novels set during World War II
Fiction set in 1943
Novels set in France
Epistolary novels
Electric Monkey books
Hyperion Books books